The 2006 European Open Water Swimming Championships was the 10th edition of the European Open Water Swimming Championships (was part of the 2006 European Aquatics Championships) and took part from 26–30 July 2006 in Budapest, Hungary.

Results

Men

Women

Medal table

See also
 2006 European Aquatics Championships
 List of medalists at the European Open Water Swimming Championships

References

External links
 Ligue Européenne de Natation LEN Official Website

European Open Water Swimming Championships
European Open Water Championships